The Extreme Scene is the first radio talk show dedicated specifically to extreme sports and action sports. The program is hosted by surf journalist Cyrus Saatsaz and pro surfer Omar Etcheverry.  It debuted in August 2003 on KNBR 1050 AM in the San Francisco Bay Area, with KSCO 1080 AM in Santa Cruz/Monterey picking up the show via syndication on September 20, 2008.

For reasons unknown, KNBR management decided to drop the show on April 30, 2009 after nearly six years. A short time later, The Extreme Scene bid farewell to terrestrial radio on May 30, 2009  after KSCO 1080 requested money for airtime. The Extreme Scene continued broadcasts via podcasting on TheExtremeScene.com  and Stitcher Radio.

American sports radio programs

It was announced that starting on May 1, 2011 The Extreme Scene returned to terrestrial radio via national syndication on May 1, 2011. The Extreme Scene currently airs on over 200 radio stations across the U.S. on the Sports Byline radio network, in addition to broadcasting internationally through the American Forces Broadcast Network and on Sirius/XM satellite radio.